Terence Rosslyn-Smith (born 28 March 1940) is a British rower. He competed in the men's coxed four event at the 1960 Summer Olympics.
Appointed MBE in 2003 “for services to the disadvantaged.”

References

1940 births
Living people
British male rowers
Olympic rowers of Great Britain
Rowers at the 1960 Summer Olympics
Rowers from Greater London